Strikwerda is a surname. Notable people with the surname include:

 Carl J. Strikwerda (born 1952), American historian 
 Hans Strikwerda (born 1952), Dutch organizational theorist
 Rein Strikwerda (1930–2006), Dutch orthopedic surgeon 
 Sienie Strikwerda (1921–2013), Dutch educator, feminist and anti–nuclear weapons activist